MTHS can be one of the following high schools:

Manheim Township High School, in Lancaster, Pennsylvania, USA
McKinley Technology High School, in Washington, MC D.C.
Metamora Township High School, in Metamora, IL, USA
Metro Tech High School, in Phoenix, Arizona, USA
Monroe Township High School, in Middlesex County, New Jersey, USA
Monterey Trail High School, in Sacramento, California, USA
Montville Township High School, in Montville, New Jersey, USA
Mother Teresa High School, in Ottawa, Canada
Mountlake Terrace High School, in Mountlake Terrace, Washington, USA